Kakara pithais a sweet deep-fried cake from Odisha offered to temple deities and served hot or cold on many festivals.

Ingredients

 Atta (Wheat Flour) – 300 g
 Chinni (Sugar) -250 g
 Nadia (Coconut) – ½ a Coconut(shredded)
 Gujurati( Cardamom) – 4 pcs
 Chhena-100 g
 Edible camphor-a pinch
 Black pepper- little and crushed
 Luna (Salt) – As per taste
 Refine Tela( Refined Oil)- for deep frying

See also
 List of deep fried foods
 Odia cuisine
 Pitha

References

Odia cuisine
Indian desserts
Deep fried foods
Foods containing coconut